Brookeland Independent School District is a public school district based in the community of Brookeland, Texas (USA).

In addition to Brookeland, the district covers portions of four counties - southwestern Sabine, northeastern Jasper (including Browndell), northwestern Newton, and southeastern San Augustine.

In 2009, the school district was rated "academically acceptable" by the Texas Education Agency.

Schools
Brookeland High School (Grades 6-12) 
Brookeland Elementary School (Grades PK-5)

References

External links
Brookeland ISD

School districts in Sabine County, Texas
School districts in Jasper County, Texas
School districts in Newton County, Texas
School districts in San Augustine County, Texas